Mukti Mohan is an Indian dancer and actress. She participated in Star One's dance reality show  Zara Nachke Dikha 2 and emerged as the winner. She also appeared on the comedy show Comedy Circus Ka Jadoo on Sony Entertainment Television. She hosted Dil Hai Hindustani 2 along with Raghav Juyal . She was a contestant on Jhalak Dikhhla Jaa 6 and Fear Factor: Khatron Ke Khiladi 7. She appeared in the films  Blood Brothers, Saheb, Biwi Aur Gangster, Hate Story and Daruvu and a YouTube web series Inmates.

Television
  Zara Nachke Dikha 2 (2010) - Contestant
 Jhalak Dikhhla Jaa 6 (2013) - Contestant
 Comedy Circus Ka Jadoo (2013) - Contestant 
 Nach Baliye 7 (2015) - Guest
 Fear Factor: Khatron Ke Khiladi 7 (2016) - Contestant
 Dil Hai Hindustani 2 (2017) - Host

Filmography
 Blood Brothers (2007)
 Saheb, Biwi Aur Gangster (2011)
 Muran (2011)
 Daruvu (2012)
 Hate Story (2012)
 Topiwala (2013)
 Kaanchi: The Unbreakable (2014)
 Born Free (2017)
Dil Hai Hindustani: The Movie (2021)
Thar (2022)

References

External links

 
 

Indian female dancers
Living people
Year of birth missing (living people)
Participants in Indian reality television series
Indian film actresses
Indian contemporary dancers
Dancers from Maharashtra
Women artists from Maharashtra
21st-century Indian actresses
Actresses in Hindi television
Actresses in Hindi cinema
21st-century Indian dancers
Actresses from Mumbai
Fear Factor: Khatron Ke Khiladi participants